The 2009 National Football League, known for sponsorship reasons as the Allianz National Football League, was the 78th staging of the National Football League (NFL), an annual Gaelic football tournament for the Gaelic Athletic Association county teams of Ireland. The League began on 31 January 2009. Thirty-two Gaelic football county teams from the island of Ireland, plus London, participated.

On 26 April, Kerry defeated Derry by 1-15 to 0-15 to win their 19th league title.

Format

League structure
The 2009 format of the National Football League was a system of four divisions. The top three divisions consisted of 8 teams, and Division 4 contained nine teams. Each team played every other team in its division once, either home or away. 2 points were awarded for a win and 1 for a draw.

Tie-breaker
If two or more teams were level on points:
 Points difference (total scored minus total conceded in all games) was used to rank the teams
 If points difference was identical, total scored was used to rank the teams
 If still identical, the head-to-head game between the teams concerned was used to rank the teams

Finals, promotions and relegations
The top two teams in Division 1 contested the 2009 NFL final. The top two teams in divisions 2, 3 and 4 were promoted, and contested the finals of their respective divisions. The bottom two teams in divisions 1, 2 and 3 were relegated.

Division 1

Table

Rounds 1 to 7

Division 1 Final

Division 2

Table

Rounds 1 to 7

Division 2 Final

Division 3

Table

Rounds 1 to 7

Division 3 Final

Division 4

Table

Rounds 1 to 7

Division 4 Final

Statistics
All scores correct as of 29 March 2016

Scoring
Widest winning margin: 34
Kilkenny 0-5 - 4-27 Antrim (Division 4)
Most goals in a match: 6
Wexford 2-9 - 4-16 Armagh (Division 2)
Most points in a match: 37
Laois 0-23 - 1-14 Fermanagh (Division 2)
Most goals by one team in a match: 5
Dublin 5-22 - 0-10 Westmeath (Division 1)
Clare 5-21 - 0-4 Kilkenny (Division 4)
 Highest aggregate score: 47 points
Dublin 5-22 - 0-10 Westmeath (Division 1)
Lowest aggregate score: 16 points
Waterford 1-7 - 0-6 Carlow (Division 4)

Top scorers
Overall

Single game

References

 
National Football League
National Football League (Ireland) seasons